Judith Ann Reisman (April 11, 1935 – April 9, 2021) was an American conservative author, best known for her criticism and condemnation of the work and legacy of Alfred Kinsey. She has been referred to as the "founder of the modern anti-Kinsey movement". Her commentary was featured by the conservative WorldNetDaily and the Christian magazine Salvo. She held a Ph.D. in communications from Case Western Reserve University, and was a visiting professor of law at Liberty University.

Advocating for children
Writing for AlterNet, blogger Max Blumenthal wrote about how Reisman's daughter's molestation set Reisman on the path of researching Kinsey's activities. Following the sexual assault, the accused boy and his family slipped out of the country, while her daughter lapsed into a deep depression. Fifteen years later, she died from a brain aneurysm, which Reisman suspected was linked to the earlier trauma.

Children in the Kinsey reports
Over the following years, her accusations against Kinsey became increasingly serious. She said that he was a fraud who had employed and relied on pedophiles for his research, and claimed that Kinsey himself had sexually abused children. This allegation drew a response from Kinsey biographer James H. Jones, who wrote that unless new evidence to the contrary becomes available, Reisman's claims that Kinsey may have witnessed or personally participated in child molestation under the guise of scientific research should be considered groundless.

Due to such ideas, she was "ostracized by mainstream academia".

Prior to the release of the 2004 film Kinsey, Reisman and Laura Schlessinger attempted to place an advertisement "alleging Kinsey was a pervert and a pedophile".

The Southern Poverty Law Center has described Reisman as a "conspiracy theorist" and a promoter of "sexual pseudoscience" in regard to her views on Kinsey. John Bancroft stated:
Reisman's campaign against Kinsey was described by Morton Hunt (1999) as follows: "To use smear tactics, methods of intimidation, and political trickery to achieve what one considers a moral end, is to live by the principle that the end justifies the means." (P. 209.)

Diederik F. Janssen has reviewed her book Sexual Sabotage: How One Mad Scientist Unleashed a Plague of Corruption and Contagion on America from a postmodern perspective. First, the observer says of her book: "This takes the unseemly shape of a paranoid sermon on American decency held together by acerbic ad hominems, a tapestry of slippery slope arguments, a string of unwholesome linkages ("Nazi serial pedophiles"), and a litany of medieval, Victorian, and McCarthyian diagnostics ("plague," "sexual psychopaths," "sexual deviancy," "perversions")." Then he considers that Reisman plays truth games precisely because Kinsey had invited sexologists to play truth games. Janssen sees her fault in "exactly the scientific cover-up of moral dilemmas she accuses her nemesis Kinsey of. To maximize this argument: what needs criticism, on behalf of children, is scientism, not moralism." He notes that if taboos need "scientific (medical) approval, their days may be numbered."

Reisman lambasted SCOTUS for trusting Kinsey's legacy (sexology): "[...] on June 26, 2003, the U.S. Supreme Court enshrined Kinsey's fraudulent data as the revolutionary moral law of our land [...] a duplicitous sexual deviant was the primary source used by the United States Supreme Court as their ‘science’ authority in Lawrence v. Texas."

About gay marriage she wrote to SCOTUS: "this Court should not permit the institution of marriage to become the latest victim of the Kinseyan model of American society." She also wrote to the Court that mainstream sexology is "an ideology built upon the sexual abuse of infants and children, and the libeling of the 'Greatest Generation'." Her opponents, however, make the argument that, pedophiles had the most to lose (not win) from the sexual revolution.

The FBI could not find any felony committed by Kinsey. In the years following the death of Kinsey, as well as Senator McCarthy and his anticommunist crusade with it, Kinsey's research only grew in public esteem and became increasingly accepted in academia in the years after his death, during which he was established as the American father of sexology.

Images of children, crime and violence

In 1983, the United States Department of Justice (DOJ) was headed by social conservatives, including Alfred S. Regnery in the Office of Juvenile Justice and Delinquency Prevention (OJJDP). Reisman had given a talk on a Washington, D.C. radio program and on CNN's Crossfire about the "connections between sex education, sex educators, and the pornography industry" which was heard by a member of the DOJ, and Reisman was asked to discuss her views in person, which "struck a common chord ... especially those opposed to sex education in the schools." She was then invited to apply for a grant, which was approved without competition for the amount of $798,531 (though later reduced to $734,371), to undertake a "study at American University to determine whether Playboy, Hustler and other more explicit materials are linked to violence by juveniles." The allocation came under criticism as the grant was approved despite a staff memo from Pamela Swain, a director of research, evaluation and program development, in which she claimed that the study could be accomplished for $60,000.

By 1986, Reisman concluded her investigation of "372 issues of Playboy, 184 issues of Penthouse and 125 issues of Hustler" that found "2,016 cartoons that included children apparently under the age of 17 and 3,988 other pictures, photographs and drawings that depict infants or youths," the details of which were collected into "a three-volume report running to 1,600 pages" titled "Images of Children, Crime and Violence in Playboy, Penthouse, and Hustler." The report drew contemporary criticism in regards to its cost and quality. Sex crime researcher Avedon Carol commented that the report was a "scientific disaster, riddled with researcher bias and baseless assumptions." The American University (AU), where Reisman's study had been academically based, refused to publish the completed work, citing concerns by an independent academic auditor. Criminologist Robert Figlio of the University of Pennsylvania stated "The term child used in the aggregate sense in this report is so inclusive and general as to be meaningless." Loretta Haroian stated about the report "vigilantism: paranoid, pseudoscientific hyperbole with a thinly veiled, hidden agenda."

Author Susan Trento chronicled additional complexities surrounding the episode. Initially, Reisman was targeted by some as a proxy to attack Regnery. The nature of Reisman's grant work and the concurrent Attorney General's Commission on Pornography, which would author the Meese Report in 1986, caused anxiety in the pornography industry. Fears began to come to fruition when 7-Eleven stores stopped selling Playboy and Penthouse, in part citing Reisman's work. Trento writes that the public relations firm headed by Robert Keith Gray was hired by Playboy and Penthouse "to discredit Meese's Pornography Commission" specifically as well as others that threatened their business, presumably including Reisman. "Whatever the merits of her research," Trento wrote, when support from the OJJDP was needed most, its leadership backed away from Reisman leaving her project to fail and leaving Reisman feeling "bitter" and "helpless" after "spending years developing an expertise and doing what she thought was an excellent job in the public interest."

In 2017, Reisman became involved in a group called Investigating YouTube. Specifically, she voiced her concern about the disturbing content in YouTube videos targeted at children, involving suggestive imagery and violence while using popular children's figures such as Frozen'''s Elsa and Spider-Man.

Sources of child sexual abuse
When Playboy and Penthouse printed nude photos of Madonna in 1985, Reisman warned that because of the entertainer's idolization by youth, their publication would destigmatize and "encourage voluntary display by youngsters," leading to an increase in child pornography.

Allegations of homosexual recruitment of children
Reisman claimed that homosexuals employ recruitment techniques that rival those of the United States Marine Corps. Reisman cited "a clear avenue for the recruitment of children" by homosexuals in her public support of Oregon Ballot Measure 9 (1992).

Erototoxins

Reisman postulated a physical mechanism to account for the dangers she ascribed to pornography: when viewed, an addictive mixture of chemicals (such as glucose sic) which she dubbed "erototoxins", floods the brain, causing harmful influences to it. Reisman hoped that MRI studies would prove porn-induced physical brain damage and predicted lawsuits against publishers and distributors of pornography similar to those against Big Tobacco, which resulted in the Tobacco Master Settlement Agreement. Further, if pornography can "subvert cognition", then "these toxic media should be legally outlawed, as is all other toxic waste, and eliminated from our societal structure." Finally, individuals who have suffered brain damage from "pornography are no longer expressing 'free speech' and, for their own good, shouldn't be protected under the First Amendment."

Endorphins are substances produced by the brain as a result of various things including sexual arousal, physical exercise, strong pain, laughter, etc. They cause pleasurable sensations and are somewhat addictive; drugs like morphine attach to the same receptors as endorphins. However, endorphins do not fit Reisman's definition of erototoxins, as many things cause them to be released, not only pornography.

The 2002-2011 Proceedings of the American Academy of Forensic Sciences state about her public statements about erototoxins: "facts stood in the way of her opinion and testimony."

Homosexuals and Nazism
Reisman said that she believed that a homosexual movement in Germany gave rise to the Nazi Party and the Holocaust. She endorsed The Pink Swastika, which elaborates on this view and has compared modern youth groups for homosexuals to the Hitler Youth.

Mapplethorpe exhibition obscenity trial

During the 1990 obscenity trial of Dennis Barrie, then director of the Contemporary Arts Center in Cincinnati, for displaying controversial photographs by Robert Mapplethorpe, Reisman was called as the only expert witness for the prosecution. In the previous year, Reisman had authored an editorial in The Washington Times entitled "Promoting Child Abuse as Art" which "accused Mapplethorpe of being both a Nazi and a child molester". The defense argued that she was not qualified as an art expert, but the judge allowed her to testify as a rebuttal witness. Among her credentials as a media specialist she listed: "preparation of educational videotapes and slide presentations for the Smithsonian Institution as well as having worked for Scholastic magazine, created audio-visual segments for television's Captain Kangaroo show, and did research for Attorney General Edwin Meese's commission on pornography and for the conservative American Family Association." During her testimony, Reisman did not discuss the sexually explicit content of Mapplethorpe's work, but rather she argued that the five photographs were not works of art because they either did not display a human face, or, in the case of Self-Portrait, the face "... displayed no discernible emotion" and absent emotion, the placement of the photographs in a museum implied that the activities displayed were appropriate. During cross-examination by the defense on her views of homosexuality, Reisman testified that "anal sodomy is traumatically dysfunctional and is definitely associated with AIDS." She also claimed that the pictures of nude children legitimized pedophilia. The defense emphasized that Reisman's experience with art was limited to her work as a songwriter.

Barrie and the center were acquitted of all charges by the jury.

Litigation against the Kinsey Institute
In 1991, Reisman, with an attorney from the Rutherford Institute, sued the Kinsey Institute, its then director June Reinisch, and Indiana University, for defamation as well as intentional and negligent infliction of emotional distress regarding alleged attempts to censor her book Kinsey, Sex and Fraud. The case was ultimately dismissed with prejudice in 1994.

 Private life 
Reisman was the daughter of Mathew L. Gelernter and Ada née Goldberg. She married Arnold Reisman in 1955 in Los Angeles. Her family was Jewish.

 Obituaries 

PinkNews reported on Reisman's death, describing her as an anti-LGBT+ author of bizarre research papers. The obituary noted her claims that gay people caused the rise of the Nazi Party, her assertions that allowing gay members or staff within the Boy Scouts of America would lead to sexual predation, and her contributions towards upholding anti-sodomy laws in Jamaica.

She received praise from the far-right John Birch Society, which stated "[...] Judith Reisman repeatedly, over the past several decades, strode into many hostile enemy camps around the world — colleges, universities, legislative bodies, media outlets — to speak truth to power and to expose vile works of darkness."

According to Robert Knight in The Washington Times: "she was cast as a careless, right-wing fanatic." He noted that she was scorned even by "conservatives who were afraid of guilt by association."

BibliographyKinsey, Sex and Fraud: The Indoctrination of a People. Judith Reisman et al.; Huntington House; Lafayette, LA (1990) "Soft Porn" Plays Hardball: Its Tragic Effects on Women, Children and the Family.  Huntington House; Lafayette, LA (1991) Kinsey: Crimes & Consequences: The Red Queen and the Grand Scheme. The Institute for Media Education; Crestwood, KY (1998) Kinsey's Attic: The Shocking Story of How One Man's Sexual Pathology Changed the World. Cumberland House Publishing (2006) Sexual Sabotage: How One Mad Scientist Unleashed a Plague of Corruption and Contagion on America''. WND Books (2010)

References

External links
 
 Appearances on C-SPAN
 
 Judith A. Reisman at SourceWatch

1935 births
2021 deaths
20th-century American non-fiction writers
21st-century American non-fiction writers
20th-century American women writers
21st-century American women writers
American columnists
American commentators
American conspiracy theorists
American relationships and sexuality writers
American women columnists
American women non-fiction writers
Anti-pornography activists
Case Western Reserve University alumni
Discrimination against LGBT people in the United States
Hate speech
Jewish American activists
Jewish women writers
New Right (United States)
Polytechnic Institute of New York University alumni
Social conservatism